Anthogonium is a genus of orchids (family Orchidaceae). At the present time (May 2014), only one species is recognized, i.e., Anthogonium gracile found in India, Assam, Bangladesh, Nepal, Bhutan, Myanmar, Laos, Cambodia, Vietnam, Thailand, Malaysia, Guangxi, Guizhou, Tibet, and Yunnan.

References

External links
 
 
 Information from orchids online

Arethusinae
Monotypic Epidendroideae genera
Arethuseae genera
Flora of East Himalaya
Flora of Indo-China
Orchids of Bangladesh
Orchids of Myanmar
Orchids of Cambodia
Orchids of China
Orchids of India
Orchids of Laos
Orchids of Malaysia
Orchids of Nepal
Orchids of Thailand
Orchids of Vietnam
Flora of Tibet